Vyborg Bay is a deep inlet running northeastward near the eastern end of Gulf of Finland in the Baltic Sea. The city of Vyborg is located near the head of the gulf.

The Monrepos Park is considered a jewel of the bay and a major draw for tourists. Since the mid-19th century, the bay has been connected by the Saimaa Canal to the lake Saimaa in Finland.

In 1790 the bay was the scene of one of the largest naval battles in history, the Battle of Vyborg Bay with a total of 498 Russian and Swedish ships.

The end of the bay is called Zashchitnaya Bay (. In the Middle Ages the river 
Vuoksi had an outlet there, which however dried up little by little due to post-glacial rebound and was left completely dry in 1857 when the  Kiviniemi rapids in Losevo, Karelian isthmus were formed and the Burnaya River became the main outlet of Vuoksa.

Lodochnyy Island lies in the middle of the bay, between Vyborg and Vysotsk.

See also
Lokhaniemi

Baltic Sea

Vyborg
Karelian Isthmus
Bays of Leningrad Oblast